Ruth Grützbauch (born 3 October 1978) is an Austrian astronomer, planetarium director and science communicator.  After earning her doctoral degree in 2007, she conducted  extragalactic research until 2013, and worked as an educator and science communicator afterwards.  Since 2017, she runs the Public Space pop-up planetarium.

Biography 
Grützbauch was born as the youngest of six children in the Viennese district of Währing and completed her Matura at a school in Simmering. In 1996, she began to study astronomy at the University of Vienna and obtained her diploma in 2003. During her subsequent doctorate, she gained international experience at the University of Nottingham in England, the Padua Observatory in Italy, and the La Silla Observatory in Chile. In 2007, she was awarded the academic degree Dr. rer. nat. after completing her dissertation on dwarf galaxies.

As a postdoc, Grützbauch did extragalactic research at the University of Nottingham and the University of Lisbon, and observed at the United Kingdom Infrared Telescope in Hawaii. Her h-index is at least 26. In 2013, Grützbauch ended her academic career and became an environmental educator. From 2015 to 2017, she worked as a science communicator at the Jodrell Bank Discovery Centre.

Grützbauch has been known to a broader public since 2017 through her planetarium, Public Space. The inflatable planetarium does not have a fixed location, but is transported by Grützbauch with a cargo bike from her home in Vienna to schools and other event locations.

Since 2020, Grützbauch hosts the astronomy podcast Das Universum together with celestial mechanic .

In 2021, she published Per Lastenrad durch die Galaxis, a popular science book on extragalactic astronomy and her planetarium.

She had worked in their prop department since 2018 and made her stage debut in 2021.

Works

References

External links 

 Public Space, the pop-up planetarium
 Das Universum (Podcast, co-hosted with )
 WRINT Wissenschaft (Podcast, co-hosted with )
 Homepage at the University of Vienna

Living people
1978 births
21st-century Austrian astronomers
University of Vienna alumni
Academics of the University of Nottingham
Science communicators
Women podcasters
Austrian non-fiction writers
21st-century non-fiction writers
21st-century Austrian women writers